Zachary Bilawka (born February 19, 2001) is a Canadian curler from Winnipeg, Manitoba. He currently plays second on Team Ryan Wiebe.

Career
Bilawka played for the Graham Loewen rink from 2017 to 2019 and the team represented Manitoba at the 2019 Canada Winter Games. The team finished the round robin with a 6–4 record, qualifying for the playoffs. They then defeated Alberta in the quarterfinals before losing to eventual champions British Columbia in the semifinals. In the bronze medal game, they were able to defeat Newfoundland and Labrador 8–7 to claim the bronze medal.

Bilawka joined the Jacques Gauthier rink at lead for the 2019–20 season with Jordan Peters at third and Brayden Payette at second. The team lost in the final of the 2020 Manitoba Junior Provincials to Brett Walter but still got to compete at the 2020 Canadian Junior Curling Championships, representing the second Manitoba team as Nunavut and Yukon did not send teams. The team finished the round robin and championship pool with a 9–1 record which qualified them for the final. The team curled 92% which led them to a 8–6 victory over Newfoundland and Labrador's Daniel Bruce. At the 2020 World Junior Curling Championships, the team finished the round robin in second with a 7–2 record. In the playoffs, they defeated Germany in the semifinal and Switzerland in the final to claim the gold medal.

Personal life
Bilawka is currently a business student at the University of Manitoba.

Teams

References

External links

2001 births
Living people
Canadian male curlers
Curlers from Winnipeg
University of Manitoba alumni